Qaleh Gah or Qalehgah may refer to various places in Iran:
 Qaleh Gah, Ravansar, Kermanshah Province
 Qaleh Gah, Dehgolan, Kurdistan Province
 Qaleh Gah, Divandarreh, Kurdistan Province
 Qaleh Gah, Kamyaran, Kurdistan Province
 Qalehgah-e Gudarz, Saqqez County, Kurdistan Province
 Qaleh Gah-e Kurkur, Saqqez County, Kurdistan Province
 Qaleh Gah-e Sharif, Saqqez County, Kurdistan Province
 Qaleh Gah, Sarvabad, Kurdistan Province